A monotonic likelihood ratio in distributions  and 

The ratio of the density functions above is increasing in the parameter , so  satisfies the monotone likelihood ratio property.

In statistics, the monotone likelihood ratio property is a property of the ratio of two probability density functions (PDFs). Formally, distributions ƒ(x) and g(x) bear the property if

 

that is, if the ratio is nondecreasing in the argument .

If the functions are first-differentiable, the property may sometimes be stated

For two distributions that satisfy the definition with respect to some argument x, we say they "have the MLRP in x." For a family of distributions that all satisfy the definition with respect to some statistic T(X), we say they "have the MLR in T(X)."

Intuition

The MLRP is used to represent a data-generating process that enjoys a straightforward relationship between the magnitude of some observed variable and the distribution it draws from. As usual for monotonic relationships, the likelihood ratio's monotonicity comes in handy in statistics, particularly when using maximum-likelihood estimation. Also, distribution families with MLR have a number of well-behaved stochastic properties, such as first-order stochastic dominance and increasing hazard ratios. Unfortunately, as is also usual, the strength of this assumption comes at the price of realism. Many processes in the world do not exhibit a monotonic correspondence between input and output.

Example: Working hard or slacking off

Suppose you are working on a project, and you can either work hard or slack off. Call your choice of effort  and the quality of the resulting project . If the MLRP holds for the distribution of q conditional on your effort , the higher the quality the more likely you worked hard. Conversely, the lower the quality the more likely you slacked off.

Choose effort  where H means high, L means low
By Bayes' law with a uniform prior,

Suppose  satisfies the MLRP. Rearranging, the probability the worker worked hard is
 
Hence if some employer is doing a "performance review" he can infer his employee's behavior from the merits of his work.

Families of distributions satisfying MLR

Statistical models often assume that data are generated by a distribution from some family of distributions and seek to determine that distribution. This task is simplified if the family has the monotone likelihood ratio property (MLRP).

A family of density functions  indexed by a parameter  taking values in an ordered set  is said to have a monotone likelihood ratio (MLR) in the statistic  if for any ,

Then we say the family of distributions "has MLR in ".

List of families

Hypothesis testing

Example: Effort and output

Relation to other statistical properties
Monotone likelihoods are used in several areas of statistical theory, including point estimation and hypothesis testing, as well as in probability models.

Exponential families

One-parameter exponential families have monotone likelihood-functions. In particular, the one-dimensional exponential family of probability density functions or probability mass functions with

has a monotone non-decreasing likelihood ratio in the sufficient statistic T(x), provided that  is non-decreasing.

Uniformly most powerful tests: The Karlin–Rubin theorem 

Monotone likelihood functions are used to construct uniformly most powerful tests, according to the Karlin–Rubin theorem. Consider a scalar measurement having a probability density function parameterized by a scalar parameter θ, and define the likelihood ratio .

where  is chosen so that 

is the UMP test of size α for testing 

Note that exactly the same test is also UMP for testing

Median unbiased estimation
Monotone likelihood-functions are used to construct median-unbiased estimators, using methods specified by Johann Pfanzagl and others. One such procedure is an analogue of the Rao–Blackwell procedure for mean-unbiased estimators: The procedure holds for a smaller class of probability distributions than does the Rao–Blackwell procedure for mean-unbiased estimation but for a larger class of loss functions.

Lifetime analysis: Survival analysis and reliability

But not conversely: neither monotone hazard rates nor stochastic dominance imply the MLRP.

Proofs

 

or equivalently:

 

Integrating this expression twice, we obtain:

First-order stochastic dominance

Combine the two inequalities above to get first-order dominance:

Monotone hazard rate

Use only the second inequality above to get a monotone hazard rate:

Uses

Economics

The MLR is an important condition on the type distribution of agents in mechanism design and economics of information, where Paul Milgrom defined "Favorableness" of signals (in terms of stochastic dominance) as a consequence of MLR. Most solutions to mechanism design models assume type distributions that satisfy the MLR to take advantage of solution methods that may be easier to apply and interpret.

References

Theory of probability distributions
Statistical hypothesis testing